Consequential may refer to:
 Consequential mood, a verb form in Eskaleut languages

As an adjective, the term may also describe:
 something arising as a result
 something of importance
 in law, results arising indirectly, for example consequential damages

See also 
 Consequence (disambiguation)
 Consequential strangers